No Greater Love is a 2010 Christian film directed by Brad J. Silverman. Lionsgate announced it acquired the North American home entertainment distribution rights to the film. Shot mostly on location in Lancaster, California, the film stars Anthony Tyler Quinn, Danielle Bisutti and Jay Underwood. It was released to DVD on January 19, 2010, and featured at the Projecting Hope Film Festival. Thomas Nelson Publishing has released a book titled, No Greater Love: A 90-day Devotional to Strengthen Your Marriage.

Plot

Cast 
 Anthony Tyler Quinn as Jeff Baker
 Danielle Bisutti as Heather Stroud
 Jay Underwood as Dave
 Aaron Sanders as Ethan Baker
 Alexis Boozer as Katie Saunders

Release 
According to Amazon.com, "Christian romance, No Greater Love, has claimed the No. 1 Hot New DVD best-seller position in both the Religious as well as the Family Life drama categories of Amazon.com."

Reception 
A columnist for The Blade said, "No Greater Love is very well crafted, however, and holds your interest as you wonder whether or how this couple and their young son can ever be reconciled after the long and bizarre separation." No Greater Love has been endorsed by many Christian organizations, including the American Family Association and FamilyLife.

References

External links 
 Official website
 

2010 films
2010 romantic drama films
American romantic drama films
2010 directorial debut films
Films about evangelicalism
2010s English-language films
2010s American films